The Uluburun Shipwreck is a Late Bronze Age shipwreck dated to the late 14th century BC, discovered close to the east shore of Uluburun (Grand Cape), Turkey, in the Mediterranean Sea. The shipwreck was discovered in the summer of 1982 by Mehmed Çakir, a local sponge diver from Yalıkavak, a village near Bodrum.

Eleven consecutive campaigns of three to four months' duration took place from 1984 to 1994 totaling 22,413 dives, revealing one of the most spectacular Late Bronze Age assemblages to have emerged from the Mediterranean Sea.

Discovery
The shipwreck site was discovered in the summer of 1982 due to Mehmet Çakir's sketching of “the metal biscuits with ears” recognized as oxhide ingots. Turkish sponge divers were often consulted by the Institute of Nautical Archaeology's (INA) survey team on how to identify ancient wrecks while diving for sponges. Çakir's findings urged Oğuz Alpözen, Director of the Bodrum Museum of Underwater Archaeology, to send out an inspection team of the Museum and INA archaeologists to locate the wreck site. The inspection team was able to locate several amounts of copper ingots just 50 metres from the shore of Uluburun.

Apparent route
With the evidence provided from the cargo on the ship it can be assumed that the ship set sail from either a Cypriot or Syro-Palestinian port. The Uluburun ship was undoubtedly sailing to the region west of Cyprus, but her ultimate destination can be concluded only from the distribution of objects matching the types carried on board. It has been proposed that ship's destination was a port somewhere in the Aegean Sea. Rhodes, at the time an important redistribution centre for the Aegean, has been suggested as a possible destination. According to the excavators of the shipwreck, the probable final destination of the ship was one of the Mycenaean palaces, in mainland Greece.

Dating
Peter Kuniholm of Cornell University was assigned the task of dendrochronological dating in order to obtain an absolute date for the ship. A branch loaded on the ship was determined to exhibit tree-rings as late as 1305 BC; but given that no bark has survived it is impossible to determine if it had further, younger rings. It has been assumed that the ship sank not long after that date. Kuniholm later cautioned that the low quality of the sample does not allow an "especially strong" dating. After a radiocarbon calibration of the entire Anatolian dendrochronological sequence, Kuniholm suggested a new date, ca. 1327 BC.

Manning et al. made Radiocarbon dating tests on several samples of plant material from the site. A sample from the cedar keel of the ship was construed as providing a terminus post quem for the construction phase. Other samples, including perishable items from short-lived species, like rope and dunnage, were construed to have come on board the ship in the phase of the last voyage. The two phases constrained each other, and Bayesian statistics was used to produce date ranges of varying probabilities. The most likely date of the sinking of the ship was rounded up to 1320±15 years.

Based on ceramic evidence, it appears that the Uluburun sank toward the end of the Amarna period, but could not have sunk before the time of Nefertiti due to the unique gold scarab engraved with her name found aboard the ship. For now, a conclusion that the ship sank at the end of the 14th century BC is accepted.

The origins of the objects aboard the ship range geographically from northern Europe to Africa, as far west as Sicily and Sardinia, and as far east as Mesopotamia. They appear to be the products of nine or ten cultures. These proveniences indicate that the Late Bronze Age Aegean was the medium of an international trade perhaps based on royal gift-giving in the Near East.

According to a reconstruction by various scholars, the Uluburun shipwreck illustrates a thriving commercial sea network of the Late Bronze Age Mediterranean. In this case, a huge mixed cargo of luxury items, royal gifts and raw materials. Based on the findings, it has been suggested that Mycenaean officials were also aboard accompanying the gifts.

The vessel

It was constructed by the shell-first method, with mortise-and-tenon joints similar to those of the Graeco-Roman ships of later centuries.

Even though there has been a detailed examination of Uluburun's hull, there is no evidence of framing. The keel appears to be rudimentary, perhaps more of a keel-plank than a keel in the traditional sense. The ship was built with planks and keel of Lebanese cedar and oak tenons. Lebanese cedar is indigenous to the mountains of Lebanon, southern Turkey, and central Cyprus.
The ship carried 24 stone anchors. The stone is of a type almost completely unknown in the Aegean, but is often built into the temples of Syria-Palestine and on Cyprus. Brushwood and sticks served as dunnage to help protect the ship's planks from the metal ingots and other heavy cargo.

Cargo
This is a list of the cargo as described by Pulak (1998).
The Uluburun ship's cargo consisted mostly of raw materials that were trade items, which before the ship's discovery were known primarily from ancient texts or Egyptian tomb paintings. The cargo matches many of the royal gifts listed in the Amarna letters found at El-Amarna, Egypt.

Copper and tin ingots
Raw copper cargo totaling ten tons, consisting of a total of 354 ingots of the oxhide ingot type (rectangular with handholds extending from each corner).
Out of the total amount of ingots at least 31 unique two-handled ingots were identified that were most likely shaped this way to assist the process of loading ingots onto specially designed saddles or harnesses for ease of transport over long distances by pack animals.
121 copper bun and oval ingots.
The oxhide ingots were originally stowed in 4 distinct rows across the ship's hold, which either slipped down the slope after the ship sank or shifted as the hull settled under the weight of the cargo.
Lead-isotope analysis indicates that most or all of the copper is sourced in Cyprus. 
Approximately one ton of tin (when alloyed with the copper would make about 11 tons of bronze).
Tin ingots were oxhide and bun shaped.
The source of the tin has not been determined (The question of tin sources in the bronze age is much discussed in archaeology). The ingots suffer from corrosion and likely contamination. However, unlike some other tin ingots from the eastern Mediterranean, they do not fit the profile of tin from Cornwall, and generally compare to ores from Sardinia. In 2022 one third of the tin was found to come from the Mušiston mine in Uzbekistan. The other share likely came from the Kestel Mine in Turkey's Taurus Mountains.
Canaanite jars and Pistacia resin
At least 149 Canaanite jars (widely found in Greece, Cyprus, Syria-Palestine, and Egypt).
Jars are categorized as the northern type and were most likely made somewhere in the northern part of modern-day Israel.
One jar filled with glass beads, many filled with olives, but the majority contained a substance known as Pistacia (terebinth) resin, an ancient type of turpentine.
Recent clay fabric analyses of Canaanite jar sherds from the 18th Dynasty site of Tel el Amarna have produced a specific clay fabric designation, and it is seemingly the same as that from the Uluburun shipwreck, of a type that is exclusively associated in Amarna with transporting Pistacia resin.
Glass ingots
Approximately 175 glass ingots of cobalt blue, turquoise, and lavender were found (earliest intact glass ingots known).
Chemical composition of cobalt blue glass ingots matches those of contemporary Egyptian core-formed vessels and Mycenaean pendant beads, which suggests a common source.

Miscellaneous cargo
Logs of blackwood from Africa (referred to as ebony by the Egyptians)
Ivory in the form of whole and partial hippopotamus and elephant tusks
More than a dozen hippopotamus teeth
Tortoise carapaces (upper shells)
Murex opercula (possible ingredient for incense)
Ostrich eggshells
Cypriot pottery
Cypriot oil lamps
Bronze and copper vessels (four faience drinking cups shaped as rams’ heads and one shaped as a woman's head)
Two duck-shaped ivory cosmetics boxes
Ivory cosmetics or unguent spoon
Trumpet
More than two dozen sea-shell rings
Beads of amber (Baltic origin)
Agate
Carnelian
Quartz
Gold
Faience
Glass
Jewelry, gold, and silver
Collection of usable and scrap gold and silver Canaanite jewelry
Among the 37 gold pieces are: pectorals, medallions, pendants, beads, a small ring ingot, and an assortment of fragments
Biconical chalice (largest gold object from wreck)
Egyptian objects of gold, electrum, silver, and steatite (soap stone)
Gold scarab inscribed with the name of Nefertiti
Bronze female figurine (head, neck, hands, and feet covered in sheet gold)
Weapons and tools
Arrowheads
Spearheads
Maces
Daggers
Lugged shaft-hole axe
A single armor scale of Near Eastern type
Four swords (Canaanite, Mycenaean, and Italian(?) types)
Large number of tools: sickles, awls, drill bits, a saw, a pair of tongs, chisels, a ploughshare, whetstones, and adzes
Axes, ceremonial axe made of green volcanic stone that originates from area Bulgaria
A small (9.5 x 6.2 cm), folding boxwood writing-tablet was found with partially extant ivory hinges. It likely would have had wax writing surfaces.
Pan-balance weights
19 zoomorphic weights (Uluburun weight assemblage is one of the largest and most complete groups of contemporaneous Late Bronze Age weights)
120 geometric-shaped weights
Edibles
Almonds
Pine nuts
Figs
Olives
Grapes
Safflower
Black cumin
Sumac
Coriander
Whole pomegranates
A few grains of charred wheat and barley

Excavation
The Institute of Nautical Archaeology (INA) began excavating in July 1984 under the direction of its founder, George F. Bass, and was then turned over to INA's Vice President for Turkey, Cemal Pulak, who directed the excavation from 1985 to 1994. The wreck lay between 44 and 52 meters deep on a steep, rocky slope riddled with sand pockets. Half of the staff members who aided in the excavation lived in a camp built into the southeastern face of the promontory, which the ship most likely hit, while the other half lived aboard the Virazon, INA's research vessel at the time. The excavation site utilized an underwater telephone booth and air-lifts. The mapping of the site was done by triangulation. Meter tapes and metal squares were used as an orientation aid for excavators. Since the completion of the excavation in September 1994, all efforts have been concentrated on full-time conservation, study, and sampling for analysis in the conservation laboratory of the Bodrum Museum of Underwater Archaeology in Turkey.

References

Bibliography

Further reading 

 
 
 
 Mumford, Gregory D. "Mediterranean Area". The Oxford Encyclopedia of Ancient Egypt. Ed. Donald B. Redford. Oxford University Press, Inc. 2001, 2005.
 
 
 Pulak, Cemal (2008). "The Uluburun Shipwreck and Late Bronze Age Trade". In Beyond Babylon: Art, Trade, and Diplomacy in the Second Millennium B.C. J. Aruz, K. Benzel, and J.M. Evans (eds.). The Metropolitan Museum of Art Exhibition Catalog.

External links

 Continuing work by the Institute of Nautical Archaeology. Archived old site.
 Pulak, Camel. Uluburun Shipwreck (1320 BC) and the Late Bronze Age Trade in the Eastern Mediterranean, 2017. The Ships that Changed History Symposium, Nautical Archaeology Program, Texas A&M University.

Ancient shipwrecks
Shipwrecks in the Mediterranean Sea
Bronze Age Anatolia
Ships preserved in museums
Archaeological discoveries in Turkey
1982 archaeological discoveries
Shipwrecks of Turkey